Prior Island is an island 1 nautical mile (1.9 km) long, lying just east of Lamplugh Island, off the coast of Victoria Land, Antarctica. The island was first charted and named by the British Antarctic Expedition, 1907–09, under Ernest Shackleton. It was probably named for George Thurland Prior, Keeper of Minerals, British Museum, 1909–27.

See also 
 List of antarctic and sub-antarctic islands

Islands of Victoria Land
Scott Coast